Malkajgiri Revenue Division is a revenue division in Medchal–Malkajgiri district in the Indian state of Telangana.

Malkajgiri revenue division	
1	Alwal	
2	Bachupally		
3	Balanagar		
4	Dundigal Gandimaisamma		
5	Kukatpally		
6	Malkajgiri		
7	Quthbullapur

References

Telangana